Ana Gabriela Gutiérrez Díaz (born 20 June 1996) is a Chilean footballer who plays as a midfielder for Club Universidad de Chile and the Chile women's national team.

References 

1996 births
Living people
Women's association football midfielders
Chilean women's footballers
Footballers from Santiago
Chile women's international footballers
Colo-Colo (women) footballers
Segunda Federación (women) players
Chilean expatriate women's footballers
Chilean expatriate sportspeople in Spain
Expatriate women's footballers in Spain